T52 may refer to:

Cooper T52, the first series of Formula Junior racing cars produced by the Cooper Car Company, built for the 1960 racing season
Diamond T-52, military trainer version of the Diamond DA40 Star, an Austrian four-seat, single engine, light aircraft
Siemens and Halske T52, World War II German cipher machine and teleprinter
Slingsby T.52, all-metal sailplane designed and built in the United Kingdom
T52 (classification), disability sport classification for disability athletics
T-52 Enryu, rescue robot
Trionic T5.2, an advanced engine management system in the Trionic series, introduced in Saab 9000 in 1993